Albania - Communist Party of Albania 8 November
China - May Fourth Movement
Colombia - Movimiento 19 de abril
Cuba - 26th of July Movement
Faroe Islands - Red 1 May Group
Germany - Movement 2 June
Greece - Revolutionary Organization 17 November
Guatemala - Revolutionary Movement 13th November
Nepal - Communist Party of Nepal (15 September)
Spain - GRAPO (Spanish acronym for "First of October Anti-Fascist Resistance Groups")
Spain - National Alliance July 18
Turkey - 10 September
Turkey - 16 June Movement
United Kingdom - November 9th Society 
United States - May 19th Communist Organization

See also
 Demonym

Movements named after dates
Named after dates